Giovanni Maria Fontana (c1670 – after 1712) was an Italian-Swiss architect, born in Lugano, who worked in Russia.

Alleged to be a relative of the famous Roman architect Carlo Fontana, Giovanni Maria or Francesco Fontana arrived in the Russian port of Arkhangelsk from Denmark in 1703. He worked in Moscow until 1710 when he moved to the newly founded city of Saint Petersburg. Nothing is known about him after 1712 (when he apparently left Russia).

Fontana's most prominent commissions were those from Prince Menshikov, to build his various palaces, notably Oranienbaum. He often worked in tandem with Johann Gottfried Schädel. Some of his designs were apparently plagiarized from architectural textbooks of the day.

References 

17th-century Italian architects
18th-century Italian architects
Italian Baroque architects
Russian architects
People from Lugano
Year of birth uncertain